The Saint Raymond of Peñafort Parish Church, also known as the Mangatarem Church, is a Roman Catholic church located in the municipality of Mangatarem in Pangasinan, the Philippines. It was first established as a visita of San Carlos and became an independent parish in 1835. The Dominicans accepted the administration of Mangatarem in 1837.

History
Father Joaquin Perez built a wooden church and brick convent from 1835 to 1844 but both were burned in 1862. The foundations of the present church was laid down by Father Manuel Alvarez del Manzano. It was continued by Father Suarez until 1875. Father Vicente Iztequi finished the church and constructed the present convent from 1875 to 1886.

Architectural features
The church reflects an Early Renaissance architectural style. It has a simple facade with low pediment. The upper and lower levels are separated by dentil-like elements. Niches, windows, and the doorway relieve the monotony of the simple facade.

References

External links

Roman Catholic churches in Pangasinan
1835 establishments in the Spanish Empire
Churches in the Roman Catholic Diocese of Alaminos